was a town located in Oe District, Tokushima Prefecture, Japan.

As of 2003, the town had an estimated population of 11,456 and a population density of 271.02 persons per km². The total area was 42.27 km².

On October 1, 2004, Yamakawa, along with the towns of Kamojima and Kawashima, and the village of Misato (all from Oe District), was merged to create the new city of Yoshinogawa.

External links
 Yoshinogawa official website 

Dissolved municipalities of Tokushima Prefecture
Yoshinogawa, Tokushima